The Ferrocarril de Agua Santa (in English: Agua Santa Railway) was a railway line in the old province of Tarapacá in Chile between 1890 and 1931.

History 
As part of the effort to extract nitrate from the Atacama desert, on December 4, 1889, the Chilean government called for tenders for the construction and concession of a railway between Caleta Buena (a port between Pisagua and Iquique) and the nitrate works around Agua Santa. On 19 March 1890,  Joaquín Lira Errázuriz' proposal was accepted.  To this end, the Compañía de Salitres y Ferrocarril de Agua Santa was established on 3 November 3. In addition to the Agua Santa saltpeter works, Abra, Primitiva, Valparaíso and Irene were also served.

The last nail was put in the track, thus completing its first section on 19 September 1890, the very last day of the 6 month time limit imposed by the authorities.

The nitrate was brought down from the plains down to the port using inclined planes.

On 30 January 1892, the construction of branches to the Rosario, Mercedes and Progreso works were authorized and in September 1893 to Huara.

Around 1896, further branches connected the Puntunchara, Rosario de Huara, Constancia, Progreso, Josefina, Tránsito, Aurora, Amelia, Slavia, Valparaíso,  Democracia Jazpampa, Pacha, Aguada, Angela, Sacramento, San Jorge and Tres Marías works.

In May 1907 a branch was laid  to Negreiros station.

In September 1915, in accordance with the terms of the concession as granted  in 1889, the track and rolling stock passed into the ownership of the State.  The Compañía de Salitres y Ferrocarril de Agua Santa signed a lease to continue using the system.

In 1931 the Ferrocarril de Agua Santa ceased operations, and 5 years later the  nitrate works of the same name also ended its production. In 1935 part of the track was lifted. In 1940 floods destroyed part of the route that was still intact. Some of the remaining infrastructure was transferred to the Iquique - Pintados Railway in 1941, which later leased it to the Compañía Salitrera de Tarapacá y Antofagasta , which in turn operated the tracks until 7 December 1951, when decree 2432 authorized their early return and the lifting of the tracks.

Alignment 
Santiago Marín Vicuña described in 1916 the railway line with a trunk route that went from Caleta Buena to Negreiros, and a branch to Huara. The distances on the branch to Huara are measured taking Caleta Buena as km0.

References 

Railway lines in Chile
1892 establishments in Chile
1931 disestablishments in Chile